Fashion Bloggers is an Australian reality documentary television series that premiered on 15 October 2014 on the Style Network. The series is the first local commission for the Australian Style Network. The reality show chronicles both the professional and personal lives of independent lifestyle and fashion bloggers.

The program was renewed for a second season in March 2015, moving to sister channel E! where it premiered on 4 June 2015.

Cast

Episodes

Season 1 (2014)

Season 2 (2015)

Broadcast
Outside of Australia, the series has been screened on variations of E! in South-East Asia, the UK, France and South Africa.

Episodes are also uploaded to the program's official YouTube channel.

References

External links 
 
 

2014 Australian television series debuts
English-language television shows
E! original programming
Style Network original programming